The Glasgow Necropolis is a Victorian cemetery in Glasgow, Scotland. It is on a low but very prominent hill to the east of Glasgow Cathedral (St. Mungo's Cathedral). Fifty thousand individuals have been buried here. Typical for the period, only a small percentage are named on monuments and not every grave has a stone. Approximately 3,500 monuments exist here.

Background
Following the creation of Père Lachaise Cemetery in Paris a wave of pressure began for cemeteries in Britain. This required a change in the law to allow burial for profit. Previously the parish church held responsibility for burying the dead but there was a growing need for an alternative. Glasgow was one of the first to join this campaign, having a growing population, with fewer and fewer attending church. Led by Lord Provost James Ewing of Strathleven, the planning of the cemetery was started by the Merchants' House of Glasgow in 1831, in anticipation of a change in the law. The Cemeteries Act was passed in 1832 and Glasgow Necropolis officially opened in April 1833. Just before this, in September 1832, a Jewish burial ground had been established in the north-west section of the land. This small area was declared "full" in 1851.

History

Pre-dating the cemetery, the statue of John Knox sitting on a column at the top of the hill, dates from 1825.

The first burials were in 1832 in the extreme north-east on the lowest ground and were exclusively for Jewish burials (see section below)
Alexander Thomson designed a number of its tombs, and John Bryce and David Hamilton designed other architecture for the grounds.

The main entrance is approached by a bridge over what was then the Molendinar Burn. The bridge, which was designed by David Hamilton was completed in 1836. It became known as the "Bridge of Sighs" because it was part of the route of funeral processions (the name is an allusion to the Bridge of Sighs in Venice). The ornate gates (by both David and James Hamilton) were erected in 1838, restricting access onto the bridge.

Three modern memorials lie between the gates and the bridge: a memorial to still-born children; a memorial to the Korean War; and a memorial to Glaswegian recipients of the Victoria Cross.

Across the bridge the original scheme was to enter the area via a tunnel but this proved unviable. The ornate entrance of 1836 remains.

The cemetery, as most early Victorian cemeteries, is laid out as an informal park, lacking the formal grid layouts of later cemeteries. This layout is further enhanced by the complex topography. The cemetery's paths meander uphill towards the summit, where many of the larger monuments stand, clustered around the John Knox Monument.

The Glasgow Necropolis was described by James Stevens Curl as "literally a city of the dead". Glasgow native Billy Connolly has said: "Glasgow's a bit like Nashville, Tennessee: it doesn't care much for the living, but it really looks after the dead."

Notable statues and sculptures

Lords Provosts in the Necropolis

 Peter Clouston
 William Collins
 Sir Thomas Dunlop, 1st Baronet
 James Ewing of Strathleven
 Sir William McOnie
 Sir David Mason
 Matthew Walker Montgomery
 Henry Monteith
 Sir David Richmond

Other burials of note

Alexander Allan, ship owner
William Burns, historian
Hector Clare Cameron
Peter Clouston
Charles Connell, shipbuilder
Very Rev James Craik, moderator for 1863/4
William Doleman, golfer
John Gibb Dunlop, engineer
Nathaniel Dunlop
John Elder, shipbuilder, and his philanthropist wife Isabella Elder
John Graham Gilbert, artist
John Honeyman, architect
John Inglis, shipbuilder
James Jeffray, anatomist
William Keddie, founder of the Scottish Sunday School system
William Logan, temperance campaigner
David MacBrayne
James McCall, veterinary surgeon
Very Rev James Duff MacCulloch
Sir James MacFarlane (1857–1944), of MacFarlane Lang Biscuits
John Macgregor, shipbuilder
David Prince Miller, magician and theatre owner
William Miller, poet
George Arthur Mitchell, mining engineer
William Rae, firefighter
Sir James Roberton
Alexander Stephen, shipbuilder
Peter Stewart, engineer – subject of a bronze sculpture by James Pittendrigh Macgillivray
John Strang, writer
John Templeton and James Stewart Templeton, each of James Templeton & Co carpet makers (the latter grave was originally coloured to look like a carpet)
Charles S. P. Tennent and his brother Hugh Tennent and son Hugh Tennent all of Wellpark Brewery (the graves face the brewery)
William Thomson, Lord Kelvin
Rev Ralph Wardlaw
James George Wilson

War graves
Glasgow Necropolis holds graves of 19 Commonwealth service personnel, 15 from World War I and 4 from World War II, that are registered and maintained by the Commonwealth War Graves Commission. The first, and highest ranking, of those buried here is Lieutenant-General Sir James Moncrieff Grierson, who died in August 1914 in France and whose body was repatriated.  His grave is in section Primus 38.

Jewish section

As Jewish people were not allowed to be interred within Christian burial grounds, a small area outwith the boundary of the main cathedral graveyard was allocated to them. The ground contains 57 burials.

Jewish burials took place here from 1832 to 1855, after which they were in the Eastern Necropolis.

The cemetery is now part of the expanded Necropolis and due to its low location its significance is often unrecognised.

The Jewish cemetery was restored in 2015.

More information about Jewish history in Scotland is available from the Scottish Jewish Archives Centre: https://www.sjac.org.uk/ .

Other memorials

Cheapside Street whisky bond fire
William Wallace memorial

See also
:Category:Burials at the Glasgow Necropolis
 Southern Necropolis, another large cemetery on the south side of the city
 Thomas Reid's tombstone

References

External links
 Glasgow Necropolis Photographs
 Glasgow Necropolis Heritage Trail PDF
 Friends of Glasgow Necropolis
 Video footage of the Lady Well
 Glasgow Necropolis, Find A Grave

Cemeteries in Scotland
Buildings and structures in Glasgow
Inventory of Gardens and Designed Landscapes
Category A listed buildings in Glasgow
Commonwealth War Graves Commission cemeteries in Scotland
Monumental masons
Tourist attractions in Glasgow
1832 establishments in Scotland
Necropoleis